Michael Holthaus (born 13 July 1950 in Wuppertal) is a German former swimmer who competed in the 1968 Summer Olympics and in the 1972 Summer Olympics. One of the most notable achievements of his swimming career was the bronze medal he earned in the 1968 Mexico City Olympics for the 400 meter Individual Medley.

References

1950 births
Living people
German male swimmers
Male medley swimmers
Olympic swimmers of West Germany
Swimmers at the 1968 Summer Olympics
Swimmers at the 1972 Summer Olympics
Olympic bronze medalists for West Germany
Olympic bronze medalists in swimming
Sportspeople from Wuppertal
Medalists at the 1968 Summer Olympics
20th-century German people
21st-century German people